Caldas Novas Atlético Clube is a Brazilian football club, headquartered in Caldas Novas, the city with the largest hydrothermal resort in the world, located in the state of Goiás. Founded on April 18, 1982. It is currently inactive in Goiás football.

History
Founded on April 18, 1982, Caldas Novas Atlético Clube debuted professionally in 2007, in the Campeonato Goiano (Third Division).

Titles
Campeonato Goiano (Second Division) (2014) 
Campeonato Goiano (Third Division) (2012)

References 

Association football clubs established in 1982
Football clubs in Goiás